Matthew Locke may refer to:
 Matthew Locke (administrator) (fl. 1660–1683), English Secretary at War from 1666 to 1683
 Matthew Locke (composer) (c. 1621–1677), English Baroque composer and music theorist
 Matthew Locke (soldier) (1974–2007), Australian soldier killed in Afghanistan
 Matthew Locke (U.S. Congress) (1730–1801), Representative from North Carolina between 1793 and 1799
 Matthew Fielding Locke (1824–1911), American politician in Texas